Nadie hablará de nosotras cuando hayamos muerto is an awarded 1995 Spanish noir drama film written and directed by Agustín Díaz Yanes.

Cast
Gloria Duque – Victoria Abril
Doña Julia – Pilar Bardem
Eduardo – Federico Luppi
Doña Amelia – Ana Ofelia Murguía
Oswaldo – Daniel Giménez Cacho
Juan – Ángel Alcázar
Ramiro – Saturnino García
María Luisa – Marta Aura
Evaristo – Guillermo Gil

Awards
 8 Goya Awards: including Best Film, Best Actress (Victoria Abril), Best Supporting Actress (Pilar Bardem), Best New Director and Best Editing.
 San Sebastian Film Festival: Best Actress (Victoria Abril) and Special Prize of the Jury
 2 Fotogramas de Plata
 3 Premio Ondas

External links
 
 

1995 films
1990s Spanish-language films
Spanish black comedy films
1990s crime drama films
Madrid in fiction
Spain in fiction
Best Film Goya Award winners
Films featuring a Best Actress Goya Award-winning performance
Films featuring a Best Supporting Actress Goya Award-winning performance
Films scored by Bernardo Bonezzi
Films directed by Agustín Díaz Yanes
1990s Spanish films